The Columbia City Ballet is a ballet company in Columbia, South Carolina.

History
The Columbia City Ballet was founded in 1961 by Ann Brodie, a former dancer with the Radio City Music Hall Ballet. The Columbia City Ballet presents four to five full-length productions and two unique Educational Outreach productions each season. 

The Columbia City Ballet tours each year in Savannah, Georgia, Charleston, SC, as well as eight other cities around the region. The Columbia City Ballet has also given tours in Chicago, Charlotte, and around Florida. Serving the community for 55 years with 30 professional American dancers and more than 2000 season members.

References

External links
 Official site